Kaithoon is a town and a municipality in Kota district in the Indian state of Rajasthan. The place is popular for its sarees known as Kota Doria.

Demographics
 India census, Kaithoon had a population of 20,362. Males constitute 52% of the population and females 48%. Kaithoon has an average literacy rate of 62%, higher than the national average of 59.5%: male literacy is 73%, and female literacy is 51%. In Kaithoon, 17% of the population is under 6 years of age.

References

Cities and towns in Kota district